Marc Balakjian (born in Rayak Lebanon, 1938, died 2017, Muswell Hill, London) was a British printmaker and artist. Balakjian is best known for his work at Studio Prints in Queen's Crescent, London, where editions of artists’ prints were created. He joined the business in 1974 and would go on to work with some of the most important contemporary British artists, including Frank Auerbach, Lucian Freud, Ken Kiff, R. B. Kitaj, Leon Kossoff, William Turnbull and Kim Lim. He married founder and collaborator of Studio Prints, Dorothea Wight, in 1973. The two would lead the workshop in introducing a number of techniques to British printmaking, and the studio was considered "at the forefront of British Printmaking for 40 years".

Balakjian was also an artist in his own right, known for her mezzotints and pencil drawings which have been exhibited around the world in countless solo and group exhibitions. His works are in a number of permanent collections in the UK including those of the V&A, the British Museum, the British Council, the Arts Council of Great Britain, the Museum of London, the Fitzwilliam Museum, The New Art Gallery Walsall. His work is also included in prominent collections in the USA, Germany, France, Netherlands, Poland, Belgium, Italy, Norway, Ireland and Canada.

Personal life
Balakjian was born and grew up in Rayak, Lebanon. His parents were of Armenian descent, having fled to Lebanon from Turkey during the Armenian genocide His father  was a cobbler.

Having studied painting at Hammersmith College of Art from 1968 to 1971, Balajian then did a post-graduate in printmaking at the Slade School of Fine Art from 1971 to 1973.

Balakjian died of pancreatic cancer on 10 August 2017.

References 

1938 births
2017 deaths
20th-century British painters